María Lorenza Barreneche Iriarte (July 3, 1926 – January 5, 2016) was an Argentine public figure and wife of the late President Raúl Alfonsín. She held the position of First Lady of Argentina from 1983 until 1989. 

Barreneche was born in 1926 in Chascomús, Buenos Aires Province, to Felipe Barreneche Echaide (1898-1984) and María Lorenza Iriarte Hospital (1898-1989). She was of Basque descent. She met her husband, Raúl Alfonsín, a law student who was also born in Chascomús, at a masquerade ball during the 1940s. The couple, who married in 1949, had six children: Raúl Felipe (b. 1949), Ana María (b. 1950), Ricardo (b. 1952), Marcela (b. 1953), María Inés (b. 1954), and Javier Ignacio (b. 1956). Barreneche, who disliked politics, focused on raising their children during her husband's political career. 

Former President Raúl Alfonsín died on March 31, 2009. Barreneche Iriarte was unable to attend his state funeral due to her own poor health. Barreneche had suffered from declining health during her later life, including loss of eyesight and decreased mobility. She died in Buenos Aires on January 5, 2016, at the age of 89. Her remains were cremated at La Chacarita Cemetery. She was buried in La Recoleta Cemetery in Buenos Aires. President Mauricio Macri tweeted his condolences to her family.

References

1926 births
2016 deaths
First ladies and gentlemen of Argentina
Argentine socialites
Argentine people of Basque descent
People from Chascomús
Burials at La Recoleta Cemetery